This list of Australian Manufacturers' Championship races summarises all rounds of the Australian Manufacturers' Championship (1971 to 1975) and its successor the Australian Championship of Makes (1976 to 1980). It does not currently include the subsequent Australian Endurance Championship (1981), Australian Endurance Championship of Makes (1982 to 1984) and Australian Manufacturers' Championship titles (1985 to 1991, 1994 and 2008 onwards).

In 1976 and 1977 these endurance races doubled as Australian Touring Car Championship rounds but in other years they were separate races not overlapping with the ATCC.

Australian Manufacturers' Championship

Australian Championship of Makes

Further reading
 1971 data sourced from Giant Killers 1972
 1973–1977 and 1980 data sourced from Australian Competition Yearbooks

Australian Manufacturers' Championship races
Australian Manufacturers' Championship races
Races
Manufacturers' Championship races
Manufacturers' Championship Races